Red Ribbon Bakeshop, Inc. is a bakery chain based in the Philippines, which produces and distributes cakes and pastries.

History
In 1979, Amalia Hizon Mercado, husband Renato Mercado together with their five children, Consuelo Tiutan, Teresita Moran, Renato Mercado, Ricky Mercado and Romy Mercado established Red Ribbon as a small cake shop along Timog Avenue in Quezon City. The cakes developed by daughter Teresita Moran are what gave Red Ribbon its prominence in the dessert market of the Philippines. In 1984, it opened its first overseas outlet in West Covina, California. The company began franchising in 1999. Today, there are more than 200 branches all over the Philippines; 32 stores all over California; five in Las Vegas; two in New Jersey (Jersey City and Bergenfield); one in Metropolitan Phoenix; two in New York City; one in Virginia Beach, Virginia; one in Chicago, one in Metropolitan Detroit, and one in Houston, Texas. Other expansion plans continue to be worked out.

In 2005, Red Ribbon was acquired by Jollibee Foods Corporation. Red Ribbon Bakeshop, Inc. is managed through JFC's holding company, RRB Holdings.

See also
List of bakeries

References

External links
Red Ribbon Bakeshop
Red Ribbon Bakeshop USA

Jollibee Foods Corporation subsidiaries
Bakery cafés
Restaurant chains in the Philippines
Restaurants established in 1979
Fast-food chains of the Philippines
Companies based in Pasig
Philippine brands
Philippine companies established in 1979
Retail companies established in 1979
Food and drink companies established in 1979
1979 establishments in the Philippines
2005 mergers and acquisitions